Agreement for Change was a Venezuelan coalition created on June 21, 2018 by former 2018 presidential candidate and Chavismo defector Henri Falcón. The coalition initially integrated seven political parties opposed to the government of Nicolás Maduro. The alliance was committed to what they called the "democratic route" through mechanisms such as voting, dialogue, peaceful protests and the rejection of foreign intervention.

History

Creation 
On June 21, 2018, Progressive Advance leader and former 2018 presidential candidate Henri Falcon, announced the creation of the alliance, composed of the political parties and movements who supported his candidacy in the recent presidential elections of May 2018. Falcon said that there was separated from the Democratic Unity Roundtable - a coalition in which militated since 2010 - but it is "deviated from its path," claiming that his coalition will follow the electoral "route". He also said that his platform will present proposals to the country in the face of the current crisis it faces.

The alliance presented its economic proposals by integrating wage dollarization.

Analysis 
Columnist Ascension Reyes from El Nacional said an internal crisis deepens in the Democratic Unity Roundtable coalition, and the creation of Concertación means another division.

Parties and movements 
Among the political parties and movements that made up this coalition are:

Elections

Municipal 
2018 Venezuelan municipal elections: 9 municipal officials (2.7%)

Municipal Councils 
According to Efecto Cocuyo news portal, out of 80 municipals that had the opposition previously held now remains with 10 following the 9 December 2018 elections.
 El Hatillo Municipality
 Chacao Municipality
 Monte Carmelo (Trujillo) Municipality
 Maneiro Municipality
 Los Salias Municipality
 Diego Bautista Urbaneja Municipality
 Simón Rodríguez (Táchira) Municipality
 Seboruco Municipality
 Francisco de Miranda Municipality
 Antonio Pinto Salinas Municipality
 Guaraque Municipality
 Buchivacoa Municipality

See also 
Democratic Unity Roundtable

References

2018 establishments in Venezuela
2020 disestablishments in Venezuela
Crisis in Venezuela
Defunct political party alliances in Venezuela
Political opposition organizations
Political parties disestablished in 2020
Political parties established in 2018